The 1993 WAFL season was the 109th of the various incarnations of the West Australian Football League. It saw an extraordinarily even competition amongst all the teams except Perth, with only three and a half games separating first and seventh and the smallest dispersion of winning percentages in the WAFL since 1921. West Perth's 13 wins and a percentage marginally under 100 is the fewest wins and lowest percentage to take top position in a major Australian Rules league: indeed no team had headed the ladder with a percentage nearly so low at any stage of a season except Hawthorn during May of 1969 and Perth during June and July 1963.

After early pacesetters Swan Districts and the inconsistent if at times brilliant South Fremantle collapsed in the second half of the season, the bottom two clubs of 1992 in West Perth (already decided on a move to Joondalup) and Claremont emerged as the favourites for the premiership as the home-and-away season and played off in the Grand Final, where the Falcons’ lack of key forwards ensured their defeat. On an individual level, the season was highlighted by Subiaco's Diamond Valley recruit Jason Heatley, discarded by Fitzroy, kicking 111 goals in his first WAFL season and playing for the league after only five matches.

This season saw the WAFL adopt 20-minute quarters with extended time-on, a change to be introduced into the AFL for the following season.

Home-and-away season

Round 1

Round 2 (Easter weekend)

Round 3

Round 4 (Anzac Day)

Round 5

Round 6

Round 7

Round 8

Round 9

Round 10 (Foundation Day)

Round 11

Round 12

Round 13

Round 14

Round 15

Round 16

Round 17

Round 18

Round 19

Round 20

Round 21

Ladder

Finals

Elimination Final

Qualifying Final

Semi-finals

Preliminary final

Grand Final

Notes
Owing to redevelopment of Perth Oval for soccer club Perth Glory, East Perth moved to Leederville after the 1999 season.

References

External links
Official WAFL website
West Australian Football League Season 1993

West Australian Football League seasons
WAFL